Bichura is a rural locality (selo) in Dmitriyevsky Selsoviet of Mazanovsky District, Amur Oblast, Russia. The population was 134 as of 2018. There are 5 streets.

Geography 
Bichura is located on the left bank of the Birma River, 40 km south of Novokiyevsky Uval (the district's administrative centre) by road. Sapronovo is the nearest rural locality.

References 

Rural localities in Mazanovsky District